Beckford railway station was a station on the Midland Railway between Great Malvern and Evesham.

It was designed by the architect George Hunt and opened 1 October 1864 and closed in 1963. It served Beckford, Worcestershire.

References

Further reading

External links
 Disused stations

Disused railway stations in Worcestershire
Former Midland Railway stations
Railway stations in Great Britain opened in 1864
Railway stations in Great Britain closed in 1963
George Hunt railway stations